A crosswalk, or pedestrian crossing, is a place designated for pedestrians to cross a road.

Crosswalk may also refer to:

Crosswalk.com, a Christian website
Schema crosswalk, in databases, a table that shows equivalent elements in more than one schema
Crosswalk, in database management, a type of table that maps together multiple associate entities
Crosswalk Project, an open-source web app runtime 
The Crosswalk, a band that included Cody Chesnutt